Alexeyevka is a rural locality (a selo) in Sapronovsky Selsoviet of Mazanovsky District, Amur Oblast, Russia. The population was 36 as of 2018. There are 2 streets.

Geography 
Alexeyevka is located on the right bank of the Birma River, 33 km south of Novokiyevsky Uval (the district's administrative centre) by road. Sapronovo is the nearest rural locality.

References 

Rural localities in Mazanovsky District